An Adventure in Sound: Reeds in Hi-Fi (also released as An Adventure in Sound - Reeds) is an album by composer, arranger and conductor Pete Rugolo featuring performances recorded in 1956 and first released on the Mercury label in 1958.

Reception

The AllMusic review by Scott Yanow stated: "Unfortunately, the novelty effects tend to overshadow the creative elements, and despite the complexity of some of the writing, the overall feel is quite lightweight. A bit of a disappointment considering the potential."

Track listing
All compositions by Pete Rugolo, except where indicated.
 "Igor Beaver" - 1:52	
 "If You Could See Me Now" (Tadd Dameron, Carl Sigman) - 2:11	
 "Yardbird Suite" (Charlie Parker) - 3:07	
 "Impressionism" - 3:11
 "Walking Shoes" (Gerry Mulligan) - 2:56
 "Theme for Alto" - 3:10	
 "Our Waltz" (David Rose) - 4:15	
 "Spring Is Here" (Richard Rodgers, Lorenz Hart) - 4:11	
 "Polytonal Blues" - 2:20	
 "Collaboration" (Rugolo, Stan Kenton) - 3:10	
 "Interlude" - 3:32
Recorded in Los Angeles, CA on October 30, 1956 (tracks 2, 4, 6, 8, 10 & 11) and November 1, 1956 (tracks 1, 3, 5, 7 & 9).

Personnel
Pete Rugolo - arranger, conductor
Harry Klee, Bud Shank - alto saxophone, flute
Bob Cooper - tenor saxophone, oboe
Dave Pell - tenor saxophone, bass clarinet, English horn
Chuck Gentry - baritone saxophone
André Previn - piano
Barney Kessel - guitar 
Joe Mondragon - bass
Shelly Manne - drums
Babe Russin, Leonard Hartman (oboe), Lloyd Hildebrandt (bassoon), Alex Gershunoff (clarinet), Morris Bercov

References

1958 albums
Pete Rugolo albums
Mercury Records albums
Albums arranged by Pete Rugolo
Albums conducted by Pete Rugolo

Albums recorded at Capitol Studios